Llop is a surname. Notable people with the surname include:

 Francisco Masip Llop (1926–2015), Spanish cyclist
 José Carlos Llop (born 1956), Spanish writer
 Juan Manuel Llop (born 1963), Argentine football manager
 Pilar Llop (born 1973), Spanish judge and politician
 Ramón Rufat Llop (1916–1993), Spanish anarcho-syndicalist
 Roc Llop i Convalia (1908–1997), Catalan anarchist, teacher, and poet
 Roser Bru Llop (1923–2021), Spanish-born Chilean painter and engraver